Keyshia & Daniel: Family First is an American reality television series starring Grammy-nominated R&B singer Keyshia Cole. The series premiered on October 9, 2012 on BET, and ended its run on December 4, 2012.

Premise
The show revolves around the family life of Keyshia Cole and her husband, Daniel Gibson, and her work as a singer-songwriter and businesswoman as she crafts her fifth studio album, Woman to Woman. All the episodes were titled after the songs from her different albums.

Episodes

References

External links

2010s American reality television series
2012 American television series debuts
African-American reality television series
BET original programming
English-language television shows
Keyshia Cole
2012 American television series endings